Quentin Seedorf (born 14 September 2000) is a Dutch professional footballer of Surinamese descent who most recently played as a left-back for Polish side Zagłębie Sosnowiec.

Career
Seedorf started his senior career with Almere City FC before joining SBV Vitesse in 2014.

In 2019, he signed for Zagłębie Sosnowiec in the Polish I liga. On 23 May 2022, it was announced he would leave the club at the end of the season.

Personal life
Quentin is the nephew of a former AC Milan and Real Madrid midfielder Clarence Seedorf.

References

External links
 
 
 
 

2000 births
Living people
Dutch footballers
Dutch expatriate footballers
Dutch sportspeople of Surinamese descent
Almere City FC players
SBV Vitesse players
Zagłębie Sosnowiec players
Tweede Divisie players
Derde Divisie players
I liga players
Association football wingers
Association football defenders
Dutch expatriate sportspeople in Poland
Expatriate footballers in Poland
Footballers from Amsterdam